This is a list of aviation-related events from 1938:

Events 
 Imperial Airways inaugurates scheduled service from London to Montreal.  Pan American World Airways is banned from British airports out of fears that more advanced U.S. aircraft will drive Imperial out of the transatlantic market.
 The National Trophy, the Harmon Trophy presented to the outstanding aviator for the year in each of the 21 member countries of the International League of Aviators, is awarded for the last time, although the annual award of the Harmon Trophy to the worlds outstanding aviator, aviatrix (female aviator), and aeronaut (balloon or dirigible aviator or aviatrix) continues.
 The Imperial Japanese Navys air arm conducts a six-month bombing campaign against Hankow and other centers of Chinese resistance in central China.
 The Civil Aeronautics Authority is established in the United States and takes over operation of the air traffic control system.
 The Spanish Republicans attempt to develop an aircraft manufacturing industry. They build 169 copies of the Soviet Polikarpov I-15 fighter during 1938, but never use any of them in combat in the Spanish Civil War.
 Late 1938 – Under Japanese supervision, the Manshū Aircraft Company is formed in Harbin, Manchukuo.

January
 Early January – Nationalist aircraft conduct a heavy bombing campaign against Barcelona, Spain.
 January 6 – Spanish Republican Minister of Defense Indalecio Prieto y Tuero proposes to the Nationalists that both sides in the Spanish Civil War ban air attacks on cities and towns in rear areas. The Nationalists reply that they will continue to bomb Barcelona unless its industries are evacuated.
Among the dead is aviation pioneer Nick Mamer, who had been piloting the aircraft. It is the first fatal accident involving Northwest Airlines or a Lockheed Super Electra.
 January 11 – The Pan American World Airways Sikorsky S-42 flying boat Samoan Clipper explodes in mid-air over Pago Pago, American Samoa, killing all seven people on board. Among the dead is Pan Americans chief pilot, the famous aviator Ed Musick, who had been piloting the aircraft. No passengers are aboard at the time of the accident.
 January 17 – Spanish Nationalist Fiat CR.32 fighters clash with Republican Polikarpov fighters over the front lines at Teruel, Spain, during the Battle of Teruel.
 January 20 – A Flight Refuelling Ltd Armstrong Whitworth AW.23 refuels an Imperial Airways Short Empire over Southampton Water.
 January 26 – Spanish Republican Air Force aircraft bomb Seville and Valladolid.
 January 28 – A 90-second air raid on Barcelona by nine Majorca-based Italian Savoia-Marchetti SM.79 bombers kills 150 people and injures 500.

February
 Luftwaffe test pilot Hanna Reitsch flies a Focke-Wulf Fw 61 helicopter indoors at the Deutschlandhalle sports arena in Berlin, Germany, demonstrating the sensitivity of its controls and the ease of flying it.
 February 2 – Two United States Navy PBY-2 Catalina flying boats flying in formation in darkness collide in mid-air and crash into the Pacific Ocean off California's San Clemente Island, killing one PBY's entire crew of seven and three of the six men aboard the other PBY.
 February 6 – The Short Mayo Composite aircraft achieves its first separation in flight.
 February 9 – On takeoff in fog from Marignane-Berre Seaplane Base at Marseille, France, the Air France Lioré et Olivier LeO H-242/1 flying boat Ville de Bone (registration F-ANPB) strikes the breakwater and crashes near Étang de Berre, killing seven of the 14 people on board.
 February 10 – A Hawker Hurricane Mk 1 of No.111 Squadron Royal Air Force, with the assistance of a very strong tailwind, flew from Turnhouse, Edinburgh to Northolt, West London, in 48 minutes at an average indicated air speed of 408.75 mph. The pilot was Squadron Leader John W Gillan (later Wing Commander John W Gillan, DFC & bar, AFC). 
 February 13 – Flying in bad weather, an Ala Littoria CANT Z.506 floatplane (registration I-ORIA) crashes into the Mediterranean Sea off Sardinia, killing all 14 people on board.
 February 15–27 – Six United States Army Air Corps B-17 Flying Fortresses make a goodwill tour of Latin America, traveling  from the United States to Lima, Peru; Buenos Aires, Argentina; Santiago, Chile; and back to the United States

March
 March 1 – A Transcontinental & Western Air Douglas DC-2 flying from San Francisco, California, to Winslow, Arizona, crashes in Yosemite National Park in Madera County, California, during bad weather, killing all nine people on board. Despite an extensive search, the aircraft's wreckage is not found until June 12.
 March 7
The Air France Potez 62 La Tapageuse (registration F-ANQR) crashes at Datia, India, shortly after takeoff from Dum Dum Airport in Calcutta, killing all seven people on board.
Spanish Nationalist forces begin an offensive in Aragon, supported by German aircraft of the Condor Legion. The Condor Legion by this time has two Messerschmitt Bf 109 groups of four squadrons, two Heinkel He 51 groups of two squadrons, four bomber groups of three squadrons equipped with Heinkel He 111s and Junkers Ju 52s, and a reconnaissance group of three squadrons equipped with Heinkels and Dornier Do 17s.
 March 7–17 – The Aragon Offensive sees retreating Republican forces bombarded by German Heinkel He 111s and Italian Savoia-Marchetti SM.79s escorted by Messerschmitt Bf 109s and Fiat CR.32s, with German Dornier Do 17 reconnaissance planes assisting in the location of targets.
 March 12 – Junkers Ju 52s carry German troops to Vienna during the German Anschluss against Austria.
 March 16 – Belfast Harbour Airport in Northern Ireland is opened, with the inaugural commercial flight to Glasgow.
 March 16–18 – Italian aircraft based on Majorca carry out a heavy, round-the-clock bombing of Barcelona, conducting seventeen air raids at three-hour intervals. Making no attempt to strike military targets specifically, they hit all parts of the city, killing about 1,300 people and injuring about 2,000.
 March 22 – The Nationalist Aragon Offensive resumes. Bombing and strafing German, Italian, and Spanish Nationalist aircraft play a large role in terrorizing and routing Republican ground forces for the remainder of the offensive.
 Late March – The British Chiefs of Staff Committee warns that in any confrontation with Germany over Czechoslovakia, the Luftwaffe would dominate the sky and that it might devote its entire force to attacking the United Kingdom as the best way of winning the war.

April
 April 19 – The Aragon Offensive ends, with Spanish Nationalists having routed Republican forces and cut Republican-controlled Spain in two. Nationalist air superiority has proven decisive in their victory, and both the Germans supporting the Nationalists and the Soviets supporting the Republicans have learned a great deal about fighter support to infantry.
 April 20 – British Air Commodore Arthur Travers Harris makes a purchasing trip to the United States to select aircraft to expand the Royal Air Force. The Lockheed Hudson and North American Harvard are chosen.
 April 25 – After a Pan American Airways Sikorsky S-43B flying boat (registration NC16932) loses power in its left engine at an altitude of  while on approach for a landing at Kingston, Jamaica, and its crew switches its fuel selector, the aircraft loses speed, stalls, crashes into the Caribbean Sea, and sinks. All 18 people on board survive.
 April 29 – In the largest air battle of the Second Sino-Japanese War to date, 18 Mitsubishi G3M bombers and approximately 30 Mitsubishi A5M fighters encounter 60 to 80 Soviet-built Nationalist Chinese fighters over Hankow. The Japanese claim the destruction of 51 Chinese fighters and admit losing two fighters and two bombers, while the Chinese admit the loss of 12 aircraft and claim to have shot down anywhere from 21 Japanese aircraft to as many as 45.
 April 30 – Ala Littoria Flight 422, a Savoia-Marchetti S.73 (registration I-MEDA) flying from Tirana, Albania, to Rome, Italy, crashes into a mountainside near Maranola, Formia, Italy, killing all 19 people on board.

May
 For the second time in six months, a Mitsubishi A5M fighter loses a third of its right wing in when it is rammed by a Nationalist Chinese fighter but flies  to its base without further incident. This time, the collision occurs over Hankow.
 A terror bombing raid by Imperial Japanese Navy Mitsubishi G3M bombers on Canton, China, kills 600 and injures 900.
 May 12
Three United States Army Air Corps B-17 Flying Fortresses use dead reckoning navigation to intercept the ocean liner SS Rex more than 600 miles at sea.
The United States Navy commissions its sixth aircraft carrier, .
 May 13–15 – A Japanese Gasuden Koken aircraft flying a three-cornered closed-circuit course over Japan breaks the nonstop unrefueled world distance record, flying .
 May 17 – The United States Congress passes the Naval Expansion Act, leading to the construction of the Essex-class aircraft carriers.
May 19 – An American Airways flight piloted by Don Keith Sheets and originating in Santiago Chile on a trip north to Antofagasta Chile crashes. It is not reported sighted until May 15, 1940.
 May 22 – The Syndicato Condor Junkers Ju 52/3mge Guaracy (registration PP-CBC) crashes into the sea just after takeoff from Santos Airport in Santos, São Paulo, Brazil, killing six of the 17 people on board. Brazilian Minister of Justice Mauricio Cardoso is among the dead.
 May 24 – A fire breaks out in the right engine of United Airlines Trip 9, a Douglas DST-A-207A flying from Newark, New Jersey, to Cleveland, Ohio. The pilot attempts a forced landing on the side of a hill near Parkman, Ohio, but the airliner crashes, killing all 10 people on board.

June
 A prototype Heinkel He 118 makes the first airborne tests of a turbojet engine.
 June 2 – Nationalist aircraft bomb Granollers, Spain, a town without military significance, killing about 100 people. Most of the dead are women and children.
 June 4 - S. T. Lowe wins Hatfield to Isle of Man air race flying a Gypsy Comper with a time of 2 hours 55 minutes 28 seconds, the fastest time of 16 international entrants of whom notable entrants were C. W. A. Scott and Giles Guthrie who came in 5th place.
 June 9 – The Nicaraguan Air Force is formed as the Fuerza Aérea de la Guarda Nacional
 June 15 – Nationalist aircraft sink the Republican gunboat Laya at Valencia, Spain.
 mid-June – Nationalist aircraft have attacked 22 British-registered merchant ships in Spanish harbors or nearby waters since mid-April. Eleven of them have been sunk or badly damaged, and 21 British merchant mariners and several Non-Intervention Committee observers have died in the attacks.
 June 20 – Karl Bode breaks the world straight-line distance record for helicopters, flying a Focke-Wulf Fw 61 helicopter .
 June 23 – President Franklin D. Roosevelt sign the Civil Aeronautics Act into law. It abolishes the United States Department of Commerce's Bureau of Air Commerce, which previously had authority over civil aviation safety, and creates a new, independent Civil Aviation Authority with centralized authority to regulate the commercial and safety aspects of civil aviation in the United States. 
 June 25 – The official public opening of Manchester Airport at Ringway, England, is held with an extensive air display.
 June 26 – The Deutsche Lufthansa Sucursal en Perú Junkers Ju 52/3mge Misti (registration OA-HHB) crashes into Cerro Chilligua near Chilligua, Peru, killing all seven people on board.

July
 In an Imperial Japanese Navy raid on a Nationalist Chinese airfield at Nanchang, three Japanese aircraft land on the field and their pilots disembark to shoot up Chinese personnel, barracks, and hangars and set Chinese aircraft on fire on foot before taking off and departing unscathed. The Japanese will use this attack technique on several future occasions.
 July 5 – 400 aircraft support a Spanish Nationalist offensive in Valencia.
 July 11 – Willy Messerschmitt purchases the controlling interest in his employer, Bayerische Fluzeugwerke (Bavarian Aircraft Works) of Augsburg, renaming it Messerschmitt AG after himself; aircraft from the previously abbreviated BFW firm retained their Bf prefixes from being flown before this date, those designs first flown after this date received the later Me prefix.  
 July 14 – Howard Hughes flies a Lockheed 14N around the world in 3 days 19 hours, to and from Floyd Bennett Field New York, more than halving the time that Wiley Post took to make the trip.
 July 15 – A German Arado Ar 79 training and touring aircraft sets an international solo speed record over a 1,000-km (621.4-statute mile) course for an aircraft of its class, averaging .
 July 17–18 – After filing a flight plan to fly nonstop from Floyd Bennett Field in Brooklyn, New York, west to California, Douglas Corrigan instead heads east after takeoff and makes a 28-hour 13-minute solo flight across the Atlantic Ocean to Ireland, claiming to have made a gross navigational error. He goes down in history as "Wrong Way" Corrigan.
 July 20–21 – The Short S.20 Mercury, flying as a component of the Short Mayo Composite aircraft combination, makes the worlds first commercial heavier-than-air crossing of the North Atlantic Ocean, flying non-stop  from Foynes, Ireland, to Montreal, Quebec, Canada, with a  payload.
 July 24 – Disaster strikes when a Colombian Air Force pilot performing an aerobatic display in a Curtiss Hawk II biplane fighter at a military review at Campo de Marte, Santa Ana, Usaquén, Colombia, disregards orders to remain above  and attempts to fly between the camps presidential grandstand and diplomatic grandstand. His wingtop strikes the diplomatic grandstand, and his aircraft careens into the presidential grandstand, destroying part of its roof, before crashing into a crowd of spectators on the ground between the two grandstands, bursting into flames and sliding through them before coming to a stop upside down. An estimated 50 to 75 people are killed, and another 100 people – including future President of Colombia Misael Pastrana Borrero – are injured. Outgoing Colombian President Alfonso López Pumarejo and his successor Eduardo Santos are in the presidential grandstand but avoid injury.
 July 25 – The Battle of the Ebro begins in Spain with a Republican offensive. Although Nationalist bombers attack bridges over the Ebro, Nationalist fighters are still deployed in Valencia and Spanish Republican fighter pilots trained in the Soviet Union gain local air superiority flying improved versions of the Polikarpov I-15 and I-16.
 July 28
 After physicians at the Mayo Clinic design a molded latex device with an attached rubber "lung" to provide oxygen for people on flights above , Northwest Airlines pilot Mal Freeburg flies a Douglas DC-3 carrying the physicians, airline employees, and his wife, with all aboard using the new device. The test is a success, and the flight marks the first use of a modern American aviation oxygen mask.
 The British Empires Empire Air Mail Scheme, in which Imperial Airways carries all first-class mail by air, begins service to Australia, using a Qantas connection forward from Singapore; Short Empire flying boats are used throughout.
 July 29
 The Pan American World Airways Martin M-130 flying boat Hawaii Clipper disappears over the western Pacific Ocean 300 miles off the coast of the Philippine Islands in the vicinity of  during a flight from Guam to Manila with 15 people on board. No trace of the aircraft or those on board ever is found. Pan American previously had flown 228 transpacific flights, logging nearly 15 million passenger miles, without serious incident.
 Former Soviet Air Force commander-in-chief Yakov Alksnis is executed, a victim of the Great Purge.
 An Arado Ar 79 sets an international solo speed record over a  course for an aircraft of its class, averaging .
 July 29-August 11 – During the Lake Khasan Incident along the border between the Soviet Union and Manchukuo, 70 fighters and 180 bombers of the Soviet Air Force conduct heavy strikes against Imperial Japanese Army positions.

August
 In an early experiment with heavier-than-air commercial aviation across the North Atlantic Ocean, a French Latécoère 521 flying boat flies from France to New York, New York, via Lisbon, Portugal, and the Azores.
 By the beginning of August, Nationalist fighters appear in sufficient numbers to establish Nationalist air superiority over the battlefield in the Battle of the Ebro. Inadequate Republican antiaircraft artillery, poor management of Republican fighters, the death of many Republican pilots, and the withdrawal of many of the best Soviet pilots from Spain all allow Nationalist aircraft to operate largely unchallenged. Small targets prove difficult for Nationalist aircraft to hit.
 August 2 – Bristol Aeroplane Company chief designer Frank Barnwell dies when the Barnwell B.S.W. – an airplane he designed and built privately – he is piloting stalls and crashes on takeoff from Bristol (Whitchurch) Airport in Bristol, England.
 August 10–11 – A Deutsche Luft Hansa Focke-Wulf Fw 200 (D-ACON Brandenberg) makes a non-stop flight from Berlin to New York, via Hamburg, Glasgow, Newfoundland, and Halifax, Nova Scotia, taking 24 hours 36 minutes for the trip.
 Mid-August – Général d'armée Joseph Vuillemin, the Chief of Staff of the French Air Force witnesses a display of the Luftwaffes capabilities during a visit to Germany, He returns to Paris and warns that the Luftwaffe could defeat the French Air Force in at most two weeks.
 August 23 – Frank Hawks, a holder of numerous intercity flight speed records, and his passenger J. Hazard Campbell die when the Gwinn Aircar Hawks is piloting strikes overhead telephone wires and crashes just after takeoff from a field in East Aurora, New York.
 August 24 – Kweilin Incident: A China National Aviation Corporation DC-2 (the Kweilin) is strafed by Japanese aircraft in China after it makes an emergency landing in a bid to escape them, the first civilian airliner in history to be attacked by hostile aircraft. The 18 passengers and the crew are Chinese; the pilot is American.

September
 September 7 – A mass flight of 17 U.S. Navy aircraft makes a 2,570-statute mile (4,138 km) nonstop flight from San Diego, California, to Hawaii in 17 hours 21 minutes.
 September 10 – Germany prohibits all foreign air traffic in its airspace except along specific air corridors.
 September 15 – The United States Army Air Corps officially activates Hickam Field in the Territory of Hawaii.
 September 21 – Major General Oscar Westover, Chief of the U.S. Army Air Corps, is killed at Burbank, California, in the crash of a Northrop A-17AS he is piloting.
 September 24–25 – Three Soviet women - Valentina Grizodubova, Polina Osipenko, and Marina Raskova - fly the Tupolev ANT-37 Rodina ("Motherland") nonstop across the Soviet Union, achieving a womens world nonstop distance record of 5,913 km (3,672 statute miles) in 26 hours 29 minutes.
 September 30 – A senior French general tells the British military attaché in Paris that in the event of a war with Germany "French cities would be laid in ruins ... They had no means of defense," and adds that France was paying the price for having neglected the French Air Force for years.

October
 No. 800 Squadron, Fleet Air Arm, becomes the first operational Royal Navy squadron equipped with monoplanes when it takes delivery of Blackburn Skuas.
 October 9 – Nationalist aircraft sink the Republican submarine C-6 at Barcelona, Spain.
This record still stands for piston-engined aircraft.
 October 25
The Australian National Airways Douglas DC-2 Kyeema (VH-UYC) crashes on Mount Dandenong, in the Dandenong Ranges in Victoria, Australia, killing all 18 people on board. Among the dead is the Australian politician Charles Hawker.
General Maurice Gamelin, Frances Chief of Staff of National Defense, puts before Prime Minister of France Édouard Daladier an assessment stating that Germany has 5,000 aircraft and France only 500, that the British Royal Air Force and French Air Force combined cannot match the German Luftwaffe, and that France cannot hope for even minimal security against German air attack before 1940 unless it embarks on a large, new aircraft procurement program.
 October 28 – Lieutenant Colonel Ramón Franco, a Spanish aviation pioneer, brother of future Spanish dictator Francisco Franco, and the commander of Spanish Nationalist air forces in the Balearic Islands, dies along with the other three members of his crew when his CANT Z.506 Airone ("Heron") seaplane crashes off Pollença, Majorca, in a storm during an attempt to bomb Republican-held Valencia.
 October 30 – Another Nationalist counteroffensive begins in the Battle of the Ebro, preceded by a three-hour bombardment of Republican positions by artillery and over 100 Nationalist aircraft.

November
 November 4 – The Jersey Airways de Havilland DH.86 airliner St. Catherine's Bay (registry G-ACZN) crashes in Saint Brélade parish on Jersey in the Channel Islands just after takeoff from Jersey Airport, killing all 14 people on board and one person on the ground. Among the dead are the daughter, son-in-law, and baby granddaughter of surveyor and aerial archaeology pioneer G. A. Beazeley. It is the deadliest aviation accident involving a fixed-wing aircraft on British territory at the time.
The nonstop distance flown is exceeded only by the closed-circuit record of  set by a Japanese airplane in May.
 November 14 – The Government of Australia separates the Civil Aviation Branch from the Department of Defence and reforms it as a separate government department, the Department of Civil Aviation, which serves as Australia′s national civil aviation authority.
 November 16 – Aircraft carrier  (launched by Cammell Laird in Birkenhead in 1937 under the 1934 build plan) is commissioned into the British Royal Navy; she is the world's first carrier with the hangars and flight deck as an integral part of the hull and with deck armor.
 November 18 – The Battle of the Ebro ends with Spanish Nationalists retaking all territory captured by the Republicans. The Spanish Republican Air Force has lost between 150 and 170 aircraft since the battle began on July 25, and the Nationalists also have lost many planes.
 November 26 – France lays the keel of its second aircraft carrier, Joffre, intended as the first non-experimental French carrier. Joffres construction will be abandoned in June 1940, and she will never be launched.
 November 28–30 – A Deutsche Luft Hansa Focke-Wulf Fw 200 makes the airline's first flight to Japan, flying non-stop from Berlin to Tokyo via Basra, Iraq; Karachi in British India; and Hanoi, French Indochina. The  flight breaks the world distance record and takes 46 hours 18 minutes.

December
 National Aviation, the Spanish Nationalist air force, has 500 aircraft, enough to ensure it air superiority in the Spanish Civil War.
 December 5 – At a meeting of the French Permanent Committee on National Defense, Chief of Staff for National Defense General Maurice Gamelin advocates that France immediately order 1,000 military planes from the United States. The committee approves his proposal.
 December 8 – Deutsche Werke launches Germanys first aircraft carrier, Graf Zeppelin, at Kiel. She will never be completed.
 December 12 – The Nakajima Aircraft Company completes the prototype of the Imperial Japanese Army Air Force′s Nakajima Ki-43 (Allied reporting name "Oscar") fighter.
 December 15 – Piloting the prototype of the Polikarpov I-180 fighter on its first light, famed Soviet test pilot Valery Chkalov apparently miscalculates his landing approach and comes in short of the airfield and, when he attempts to correct his error, the engine stalls and the plane crashes into power lines. Chkalov is thrown from the cockpit ad dies of his injuries two hours later. The crash deals a blow to aircraft designer Nikolai Nikolaevich Polikarpov′s reputation with Josef Stalin and effectively ends his career.

First flights 
 Aeronca 50 Chief
 Arado Ar 79
 Arado Ar 96
 Beriev MDR-5
 Cierva C.40
 Piaggio P.50-II
 Polikarpov I-152
 Late 1938 – Aichi E13A (Allied reporting name "Jake")

January
 Aichi D3A (Allied reporting name "Val")
 January 5 - Miles M.16 Mentor L4932
 January 18 – Farman F.223.01, prototype of the SNCAC NC.223
 January 21 - Potez-CAMS 141
 January 22 - Heinkel He 100
 January 24 - Armstrong Whitworth Ensign

February
 Polikarpov Ivanov
 February 2 - Junkers Ju 88 V4
 February 21 – Miles M.17 Monarch
 February 22 – Fleet 50J, prototype of the Fleet50K
 February 25 – Blohm & Voss BV 141

March
 March 1 – Vought XOS2U-1, prototype of the OS2U Kingfisher
 March 12 – PZL.44 Wicher

April
 April 6 – Bell XP-39, prototype of the Bell P-39 Airacobra, the first United States Army Air Corps fighter with tricycle landing gear
 April 20 – Tachikawa Ki-36 (Allied reporting name "Ida")

May
 May 11 – Polikarpov VIT-2
 May 21 - Dornier Do 26

June
 Teradako-ken TK-3
 June 7 - Boeing Model 314
 June 7 - Douglas DC-4E
 June 14 - Hawker Hotspur K8309
 June 20 - Potez-CAMS 160

July
 Focke-Wulf Fw 189
 July 26 - Potez 662

August
 Dornier Do 217
 PZL.46 Sum
 August 3 – Martin-Baker MB 2

September
 September 22 (probable date) – Miles M.15
 September 28 - Avia B.35
 September 29 - Supermarine Sea Otter

October
 October 2 – Dewoitine D.520
 October 4 – Dornier Do 217
 October 11
 Blohm & Voss BV 142
 Curtiss CW-21
Westland Whirlwind prototype L6844
 October 14
 Curtiss Model 75P, later redesignated XP-40, prototype of the Curtiss P-40
 Saro A.33 K4773
 October 15 – Bristol Beaufort prototype L4441
 October 26 – Douglas Model 7B, prototype of the A-20 Havoc, Douglas DB-7, and Douglas Boston

November
 Saunders-Roe A.36 Lerwick

December
 December 4 – Miles M.18
 December 6 – K-2, first U.S. Navy K-class blimp
 December 10 – Lockheed Hudson
 December 15 – Polikarpov I=180
 December 12 – Fairey Albacore prototype L7074
 December 22
De Havilland Flamingo
Seversky AP-4, predecessor of the Republic P-43 Lancer
 December 23 – Blackburn Roc prototype L3057
 December 28 – Blackburn Botha
 December 31 – Boeing 307 Stratoliner

Entered service 
 Arado Ar 79
 Beriev Be-2 with Soviet Naval Aviation
 Grumman F3F with the United States Navy
 Mitsubishi Ki-30 (Allied reporting name "Ann") with Imperial Japanese Army Air Force
 Watanabe E9W (Allied reporting name "Slim") with the Imperial Japanese Navy, first Japanese aircraft designed specifically for operation from a submarine
 Spring 1938 – Seversky P-35 with the United States Army Air Corps 1st Pursuit Group

January
 Kawanishi H6K (Allied reporting name "Mavis") with the Imperial Japanese Navy

April
 Northrop BT with United States Navy Bombing Squadron 5 (VB-5) aboard

May
 Potez 630 with the French Air Force

June
 Westland Lysander with No. 16 Squadron, Royal Air Force

July
 Armstrong Whitworth Ensign with Imperial Airways
 Junkers Ju 90 with Deutsche Luft Hansa

August
 Mitsubishi Ki-21 (Allied reporting name "Sally") with Imperial Japanese Army Air Forces 60th Group
 Potez 631 with the French Air Force
 Supermarine Spitfire with No. 19 Squadron RAF, based at RAF Duxford

September
 Handley Page Hampden with the Royal Air Force's No. 49 Squadron

October
 Vickers Wellington with No. 9 Squadron RAF
 Armstrong Whitworth Ensign with Imperial Airways

November
 Arado Ar 196
 Blackburn Skua with 800 Naval Air Squadron, Fleet Air Arm, Royal Navy

Retirements
 Saro A.21 Windhover by Jersey Airways
 Westland CL.20

April
 Avro Sea Tutor by the Royal Air Force Seaplane Training School

References

 
Aviation by year